East Stony Creek is a river in the Adirondack Mountains of New York. It begins at Lizard Pond and flows into the Sacandaga River north of Northville, New York.

References 

Rivers of New York (state)
Tributaries of the Sacandaga River